This is a list of episodes from the Second Season of Tour of Duty with episode summaries.

Production

Cast
 Terence Knox as Clayton Ezekiel "Zeke" Anderson
 Stephen Caffrey as Myron Goldman
 Tony Becker as Daniel "Danny" Purcell
 Stan Foster as Marvin Johnson
 Ramón Franco as Alberto Ruiz
 Miguel A. Núñez Jr. as Marcus Taylor
 Kim Delaney as Alex Devlin
 Dan Gauthier as Johnny McKay
 Betsy Brantley as Jennifer Seymour
 Richard Brestoff as Major Darling

Crew
Producers:
 Zev Braun - Executive Producer
 Bill L. Norton - Co-Executive Producer
 Ronald L. Schwary - Producer
 Rick Husky - Supervising Producer
 Steve Bello - Co-Producer
 Steven Phillip Smith - Co-Producer

Writers:
 Rick Husky (2 episodes)
 Dennis Cooper (1 episodes)
 Steven Phillip Smith (1 episodes)

Directors:
 Bill L. Norton (2 episodes)
 Ed Sherin (2 episodes)

Episodes

References

Tour of Duty (TV series) seasons
1989 American television seasons